Šoldra, Šoldr is a traditional Silesian cuisine Easter bread. It is also known as muřin . It is traditionally prepared and eaten on Easter Sunday.

Šoldra/szołdra is an archaic Polish term for ham and murzyn/muřin literally means "black person", and refers to blackening of the dish.

The dough is stuffed with sausage varieties such as smoked meat sausage, white wine sausage, and ham/pork sausage. Almond meal is used.

See also
Folar, Portuguese Easter bread sometimes stuffed with meat
Easter foods
 List of stuffed dishes

References

Silesian cuisine
Easter bread
Stuffed dishes